Isaac Teller (February 7, 1799 – April 30, 1868) was a U.S. Representative from New York, nephew of Abraham Henry Schenck.
Born in Matteawan, New York, Teller completed preparatory studies and held several local offices. 
Teller was elected as a Whig to the Thirty-third Congress to fill the vacancy caused by the resignation of Gilbert Dean and served from November 7, 1854, to March 3, 1855.
He engaged in agricultural pursuits. He died in Matteawan (now Beacon), New York, April 30, 1868.
His interment was located in Fishkill Rural Cemetery.

Sources

1799 births
1868 deaths
Whig Party members of the United States House of Representatives from New York (state)
19th-century American politicians